Development and Educational Communication Unit is an arm of Indian Space Research Organisation which aims at planning and imparting training the personnel for usage of satellite based communication systems for societal needs. The main objective of the organisation is to plan and envisage satellite usage for the general population in domains such as education and medicine, as well as many others.

History
Established in 1989, the Development and Educational Communication Unit of ISRO has been involved in societal research with the objective of bringing India's indigenously developed space technology back to the people of rural India. The Space Applications Centre, Ahmedabad provides the necessary technical support to the unit. Between 1975 and 1990, this unit implemented the Kheda Communications Project in the Kheda village of Gujarat to bring satellite-based communication to the village residents. This project would go on to receive the IPDC-UNESCO Prize for Rural Communication.

Projects

Kheda Communications Projects
Started in 1975, KCP was India's first rural communication project. KCP aimed at providing television broadcasting and allied communication services to the targeted rural areas. KCP was a joint collaboration between the Government of India, the United States Government and the United Nations. The United Nations Development Program (UNDP) donated low cost transmitters and satellite earth stations to this project. About 650 television sets were distributed to nearly 400 villages in this project. The project received the 1985 IPDC-UNESCO Prize for Rural Communication. The project was subsequently taken as a reference for implementation of the GRAMSAT pilot project.

Jhabua Development Communications Project
Jhabua Development Communications Project had evolved out from Kheda Communication projects. Watershed management, health, education and panchayati raj are the mission purpose of this project. The JDCP has 2 components:
Broadcasting of information and
Interactive training programmes
JDCP along with the kheda and EduSat have proven to be successful means to communicate to the remote areas of the country and to provide them an information medium at a reasonably cost.

EduSat
DECU supported the implementation of the EduSat project by installing devices for audio-video data transmission. EduSat is the flagship project of the Department of Science and Technology (India) which aims at providing education to the masses by using a satellite-based transmission system.

References

External links
 Official ISRO DECU

Space programme of India
Research institutes in Ahmedabad
1989 establishments in Gujarat
Research institutes established in 1989